FC Khimik is a Russian football club from Koryazhma.

It played professionally for one season in 1994, taking 8th place in Zone 4 of the Russian Third League.

External links
  Profile at stats.sportbox.ru
  Team history at KLISF

References

Association football clubs established in 1992
Football clubs in Russia
Sport in Arkhangelsk Oblast
1992 establishments in Russia